This is a list of American films released in 2015.

Box office
The highest-grossing American films released in 2015, by domestic box office gross revenue, are as follows:

Box office records
Jurassic World grossed $208.8 million domestically in its opening weekend, making it the biggest domestic opening weekend of all time, surpassing The Avengers ($207.4 million on 4–6 May 2012). The film also grossed $106.6 million domestically in its second weekend, making it the biggest domestic second weekend of all time, surpassing The Avengers again ($103 million on 11–13 May 2012). In its third weekend, the film grossed $54.5 million, becoming just the third film to gross more than $50 million in its third weekend, along with The Avengers and Avatar. Onv vĠ June 19, the film became the 51st film to reach $300 million, and the fastest film to do so, achieving the milestone in just eight days, surpassing The Avengers (which took nine days to reach the benchmark); on June 21, the film became the 17th film to reach $400 million, and the fastest film to do so, achieving the milestone in just ten days, surpassing The Avengers (which took fourteen days to reach the benchmark); on June 28, the film became the fifth film to reach $500 million (joining The Avengers, Avatar, The Dark Knight, and Titanic) and the fastest film to do so, achieving the milestone in just 17 days, surpassing The Avengers (which took 23 days to reach the benchmark). On July 17, the film became the fourth film to reach $600 million and the fastest film to do so, achieving the milestone in 36 days, surpassing Avatar (which took 47 days to reach the benchmark). On September 23, the film became the third film to reach $650 million, achieving the milestone in 104 days, which is second-fastest behind Avatar (which took 58 days to reach the benchmark); it also became the third film to gross over $650 million domestically while also grossing over $1 billion outside North America.
Inside Out grossed $90.4 million domestically in its opening weekend, making it the biggest domestic opening weekend for an original film of all time, surpassing Avatar ($77 million on 18–20 December 2009). The film became the fastest animated film to reach $100 million, achieving the milestone in just four days, surpassing Shrek 2 (which took five days to reach the benchmark). On July 18, Inside Out became the eighth animated film, and 52nd film over all, to gross more than $300 million domestically, joining Shrek 2, The Lion King, Toy Story 3, Frozen, Finding Nemo, Despicable Me 2, and Shrek the Third. On September 11, the film became the seventh animated film to gross more than $350 domestically.
Minions grossed $46.04 million domestically on its opening day, making it the biggest domestic opening day for an animated film, surpassing Toy Story 3 ($41.1 million on 18 June 2010). The film became the fastest animated film to reach $100 million, achieving the milestone in just three days, surpassing Inside Out; the film also joined Toy Story 3 as the fastest animated film to reach $200 million, achieving the milestone in nine days. On August 8, Minions became the ninth animated film, and 53rd film overall, to gross more than $300 million domestically.
Straight Outta Compton grossed $60.2 million domestically in its opening weekend, making it the biggest domestic opening weekend for a music biopic of all time, surpassing Walk the Line ($22.3 million on 18–20 November 2005). The film took only nine days to gross $100 million at the domestic box office, becoming only the second music biopic to cross the milestone, and surpassing Walk the Line (which took 65 days to reach the benchmark). By August 27, the film had earned $120.9 million to become the highest domestic grossing music biopic of all time, surpassing Walk the Line ($119.5 million), and by September 21, the film had earned $188.99 million to become the highest worldwide grossing music biopic of all time, surpassing Walk the Line's worldwide lifetime gross of $186.4 million.
Star Wars: The Force Awakens grossed $57 million domestically in Thursday preview showings, making it the biggest preview showing of all time, surpassing Harry Potter and the Deathly Hallows – Part 2 ($43.5 million in previews on 14 July 2011); the total included a record $5.7 million in IMAX ticket sales, surpassing Avengers: Age of Ultron ($3 million on 30 April 2015). The film went on to gross $119.1 million domestically on Friday (including Thursday's receipts), making it the biggest opening day and the biggest single day of all time, again surpassing Deathly Hallows – Part 2 ($91 million on 15 July 2011) to become the only film ever to gross more than $100 million in a single day and the fastest film to reach the $100 million milestone (surpassing 15 other films, including most recently Jurassic World on 12–13 June 2015, which took two days to reach the benchmark). Excluding Thursday preview receipts, Force Awakens grossed $62.1 million on its opening Friday, surpassing Deathly Hallows – Part 2 ($47.5 million on 15 July 2011); the film's Friday total included a record $14 million in IMAX ticket sales. The film also grossed $68.3 million on Saturday, the third-highest Saturday gross (behind Jurassic World, The Avengers) and becoming the fourth film to gross more than $60 million on a Saturday (along with Iron Man 3); the film then grossed $60.5 million on Sunday, becoming the first film to gross more than $60 million on a Sunday and surpassing Jurassic World ($57.2 million on 14 June 2015), for a total weekend gross of $248 million, making it the biggest domestic opening weekend of all time, surpassing Jurassic World ($208.8 million on 12–14 June 2015). The total also contributed to a record total weekend gross of $305.55 million for all films, surpassing the weekend of 12–14 June 2015 ($266 million during the opening of Jurassic World), and was the biggest December opening weekend of all time, surpassing The Hobbit: An Unexpected Journey ($84.6 million on 14–16 December 2012), including a record $30.1 million in IMAX ticket sales. On December 21, the film grossed another $40.1 million, surpassing Spider-Man 2 ($27.7 million on 5 July 2004) for biggest Monday gross and becoming the first film ever to gross more than $30 million and $40 million on a Monday; the film also become the fastest film to gross $250 million, achieving the milestone in four days and surpassing Jurassic World (which took five days to reach the benchmark). On December 22, the film grossed another $37.36 million, surpassing The Amazing Spider-Man ($35 million on 3 July 2012) for biggest Tuesday gross; the film also became the 54th to reach $300 million, and the fastest film to do so, achieving the milestone in just five days, surpassing Jurassic World (which took eight days to reach the benchmark). On December 24th, the film earned another $27.59 million to raise its domestic opening week gross to $391.1 million, surpassing Jurassic World ($296.2 million on 12–18 June 2015). On 25 December, the film grossed $49.3 million, breaking the record for a non-opening Friday gross by surpassing Transformers: Revenge of the Fallen ($36.74 million on 26 June 2009), and breaking the record for a Christmas Day gross by more than doubling Sherlock Holmes ($24.6 million on 25 December 2009); the day also raised the film's total domestic gross to $440.4 million, breaking the record for an 8-day gross and surpassing Jurassic World ($325.3 million on 12–19 June 2015), as well as becoming the 18th film to reach $400 million, and the fastest film to do so, achieving the milestone in just eight days, surpassing Jurassic World (which took ten days to reach the benchmark). On December 26, the film grossed another $56.6 million, breaking the record for highest second Saturday gross and surpassing The Avengers ($42.9 million on 12 May 2012) before grossing an additional $47.6 million on Sunday and breaking the record for highest second Sunday gross and surpassing Jurassic World ($38.4 million on 21 June 2015); the film grossed a total of $153.5 million in its second weekend, making the biggest domestic second weekend of all time and surpassing Jurassic World ($106.6 million on 19–21 June 2015), and raised its total domestic gross to $544.57 million, making Force Awakens just the sixth film to reach $500 million, and the fastest film to do so, achieving the milestone in just ten days and surpassing Jurassic World (which took 17 days to reach the benchmark).

January–March

April–June

July–September

October–December

See also
 2015 in American television
 2015 in the United States

References

External links
 
 List of 2015 box office number-one films in the United States

2015
Lists of 2015 films by country or language
Films